Emery–Dreifuss muscular dystrophy (EDMD) is a type of muscular dystrophy, a group of heritable diseases that cause progressive impairment of muscles. EDMD affects muscles used for movement (skeletal muscles), causing atrophy, weakness and contractures. It almost always affects the heart, causing abnormal rhythms, heart failure, or sudden cardiac death. It is rare, affecting 0.39 per 100,000 (1 per 250,000) people. It is named after Alan Eglin H. Emery and Fritz E. Dreifuss.

Signs and symptoms

The classic triad of EDMD consists of early contractures, muscle weakness, and heart involvement, typically manifesting in adolescence.

Contractures often manifest before weakness, and they can be more disabling. They tend to fix the elbow into flexion and ankle into plantarflexion via Achilles tendon shortening. The spine is also affected, with limited neck flexion initially, and eventually the entire spine can become fixed into extension, referred to as a rigid spine. Elbow and neck contractures seldom occur in other diseases. Eventually, orthopedics (walker, cane) may be needed.

The weakness is slowly progressive and preferentially involves the muscles that overlie the humerus bone (biceps and triceps muscles) and those situated on the outside of the lower leg (peroneal). Later, the muscles that position the scapula can be weakened, completing a pattern that is termed 'scapulohumeroperoneal'. Weakness of the scapular fixators can cause a winged scapula, which can impair the ability to lift the arms over the head and can be painful. Weakness of the peroneal muscles can result in toe walking, which can present in the first decade of life. Facial, hand, and thigh muscles can be affected, although less often. Calf hypertrophy can occur.

Involvement of the heart occurs in almost all cases, presenting as syncope in second or third decades, or as sudden cardiac death. A multitude of cardiac arrhythmias can result, requiring a pacemaker often by age 30 years. Reported arrhythmias include bradycardia, atrial fibrillation/flutter, atrioventricular conduction defect, and atrial paralysis. Later in the disease, cardiomyopathy can occur. Sometimes, cardiac involvement is the predominant manifestation of EDMD, with minimal involvement of the skeletal muscles.

EDMD1
Skeletal muscle involvement usually occurs before cardiac involvement. Of female carriers, 10-20% have abnormal heart rhythm or conduction, with increased risk of sudden cardiac death.

EDMD2
Disease course of EDMD 2 is more severe than EDMD1. Compared to EDMD1, cardiac symptoms are more likely to be the initial manifestation. EDMD2 can result in a much broader spectrum of disease, and the severity of muscle weakness is less predictable. However, muscle weakness typically is slowly progressive in first three decades, with an increased rate of progression thereafter.

Genetics
Mutations in the one of several genes cause the various types of Emery–Dreifuss muscular dystrophy. Mutation of the EMD or LMNA gene is the cause in 40% of cases. Each gene implicated in EDMD provides instructions for making a protein that is associated with the nuclear envelope, which surrounds the nucleus of a cell. The nuclear envelope regulates the movement of molecules into and out of the nucleus, and researchers believe it may play a role in regulating the activity of certain genes.

Mutations of the genes SUN1 and SUN2 have each been shown to cause EDMD in single cases. TTN has also been associated with EDMD phenotype.

Pathophysiology

Genetic mutations causing EDMD affect proteins comprising the nuclear membrane. Possibly, in all EDMD subtypes there is impaired protein importation into the nucleus. Another possibility is that in all subtypes, there is a loss of nuclear structural integrity.

Diagnosis

A positive genetic test in a person with the signs and symptoms of EDMD provides definitive diagnosis. Genetic testing can involve single-gene testing or genomic testing. Auxiliary testing can include the following:

Classification
Emery–Dreifuss muscular dystrophy can be sub-classified by pattern of inheritance: X-linked, autosomal dominant, and autosomal recessive.
 Autosomal dominant: heart problems with weakness (and wasting) of skeletal muscles and Achilles tendon contractures.
 X-linked: result of the EMD gene mutation, characterized by cardiac involvement.
 Autosomal recessive: characterized by cardiac issues, such as arrhythmia.

Differential 
Contractures manifest early in the disease course. Other diseases that have early or congenital contractures are diseases involving collagen mutations, including Ullrich congenital muscular dystrophy and Bethlem myopathy. SEPN1-related myopathy and arthrogryposis multiplex congenita also cause congenital contractures.

Weakness initially affects the humeral and peroneal muscles, progressing to involve the scapular and pelvic muscles. Facioscapulohumeral muscular dystrophy has a similar muscle involvement pattern.

Management

Following diagnosis, extent of disease should be established in regards to the heart, the lungs, and the muscles/bones (musculoskeletal). Metabolic functions should also be assessed, as lipodystrophy can co-occur with EDMD, by measuring levels of sugar, cholesterol, and triglycerides in the blood. Tests useful for heart evaluation include electrocardiography (EKG), echocardiography (echo), cardiac MRI, and electrophysiology studies. Musculoskeletal function can be assessed by a physical therapist or orthopedist.

Regardless of extent of disease, cardiac and respiratory complications should be monitored for. EKG, holter, and echo are recommended yearly, and additional tests can be indicated depending on heart involvement. Pulmonary function tests (PFTs) are recommended every 2–3 years, or yearly in those with respiratory involvement.

Although the root cause of EDMD is not currently treatable, its manifestations and complications can be treated. Heart involvement can be addressed with medications (antiarrhythmics, beta-blockers, and ACE inhibitors), pacemakers, defibrillators, and sometimes heart transplantation. Affecting breathing can be addressed with physical therapy and, later in disease, mechanical ventilation. Contractures and scoliosis can be addressed with orthopedic surgery. Mobility can be improved with physical therapy, occupational therapy, and mechanical aids (canes, orthoses, wheelchairs).

Epidemiology
It is rare, affecting 0.39 per 100,000 (1 per 250,000) people.

See also
 Laminopathies
 Noncompaction cardiomyopathy

References

Further reading

External links 

Muscular dystrophy